Daniel Crozier is an American composer and academic. He is associate professor of Theory and Composition at Rollins College in Winter Park, Florida.

Career 

Works by Crozier have received performances in New York, Philadelphia, Baltimore, Pittsburgh, Boston, Toronto, Syracuse (New York), at Washington's Kennedy Center, the Aspen Music Festival, the Oregon Bach Festival Composers' Symposium, and by the Bach Festival Society of Winter Park, and have been recorded by MARK Records and Navona Records as well as for broadcast by the Belgian Radio and Television Network. "Ceremonies for Orchestra", Triptych, his first symphony, has been recorded by the Seattle Symphony under conductor Gerard Schwarz. The Toccata for Soprano Saxophone and String Trio was premiered in 2002 by saxophonist Branford Marsalis and the Walden Chamber Players. In June 2004, he was invited by composer John Harbison to serve as a guest composer at the Songfest 2004 Program for New Art Song at Pepperdine University.

Crozier's awards include ASCAP Special Awards annually since 1996, an ASCAP Foundation Young Composer's Grant for his first opera, The Reunion, to a libretto by Roger Brunyate, and first prize in the National Opera Association Chamber Opera Competition for his second, With Blood, With Ink, to a libretto by Peter M. Krask. In May 2000, excerpts from the opera were included in the New York City Opera's Showcasing American Composers Series. At the opera's premiere, the critic for The Baltimore Sun wrote: "Composer Crozier has responded to this libretto with music of extraordinary depth and power. He gives the characters and their story a compelling richness enviable for a composer his age." The opera was first staged professionally in April 2014 at the Fort Worth Opera.

Crozier has worked with Eliot Newsome, Jean Eichelberger Ivey, and John Harbison. He holds the Doctor of Musical Arts degree from the Peabody Conservatory of the Johns Hopkins University and has served on the faculty at the Peabody Preparatory, Radford University, and is currently Assistant Professor of Theory and Composition at Rollins College.

Crozier currently works at Rollins College in Winter Park, Florida.

References

External links
Profile at Rollins College

Living people
Place of birth missing (living people)
Johns Hopkins University alumni
Radford University faculty
Rollins College faculty
American male classical composers
American classical composers
American opera composers
Male opera composers
Musicians from Baltimore
21st-century conductors (music)
21st-century American male musicians
Year of birth missing (living people)